The .50-140 Sharps rifle cartridge is a black-powder cartridge that was introduced in 1884 as a big game hunting round. It is believed to have been introduced for the Sharps-Borchardt Model 1878 rifle. The cartridge is very similar to the .500 Black Powder Express.

This round was introduced by Winchester 3 years after the Sharps Rifle Company closed its doors in 1881. It is similar to, though larger than, the .50-90 Sharps.
With the Sharps Rifle Co. officially closing in 1881, and with the .50-140 being introduced 3 years latter, the .50-140 CAN NOT be classified as Sharp's most powerful chambering

Specifications

The powder charge is typically  of black powder. Modern substitutes such as Pyrodex are sometimes used, although using smaller charges since pyrodex is less dense than black powder. In a strong action with modern smokeless powder, it can exceed a  .458 Winchester Magnum velocity while using a heavier  bullet.

Dimensions

History 
The .50-140 was created for big game hunting, and was the most powerful of the Sharps Bison cartridges. However, it was introduced about the time of the end of the great Bison herds. An obsolete round, ammunition is not produced by any major manufacturer although reloading components and brass can be acquired or home-built.

Rifles are infrequently produced by a few companies. They are typically used for bison hunting and reenactments. Occasionally, the .50-140 is used in vintage competitions, although some shooters claim it produces heavier recoil than other old-time cartridges such as the .45-70.

See also
List of rifle cartridges
13 mm caliber (greater than .51 inches)

References

Accurate Smokeless Powders Loading Guide Number Two (Revised), Book by Accurate Arms Co, Wolfe Publishing, 2000 p. 371

External links

 Sharps
 

50-140 Sharps
Sharps cartridges